Requirements to Be a Normal Person is a 2015 Spanish comedy film directed by Leticia Dolera, which stars Dolera alongside Manuel Burque.

Cast

See also 
 List of Spanish films of 2015

References

External links 

2015 comedy films
Spanish comedy films
2010s Spanish-language films
2010s Spanish films